Hihya is a city in the Sharqia Governorate, Egypt. It had a population of 66,702 in the 2017 census.

The 1885 Egyptian census recorded Hihya as a nahiyah in the district of Sawaleh in Sharqia Governorate; at that time, the population of the city was 4,011 (2,009 men and 2,002 women).

Notable people
 Sama El Masry, an Egyptian dancer.

See also

 List of cities and towns in Egypt

References

Populated places in Sharqia Governorate